This article is a list of diseases of pearl millet (Pennisetum glaucum).

Bacterial diseases

Fungal diseases

Viral diseases

Nematodes, parasitic

Insects
Insect pests include:

Seedling pests
shoot fly Atherigona approximata (major seedling pest)
Atherigona soccata, Atherigona oryzae, Atherigona punctata, Atherigona ponti, and Atherigona yorki
anthomyiid flies Delia arambourgi and Delia flavibasis (Ethiopia)

Stem borers
lepidopteran borers: Chilo partellus, Chilo infuscatellus, Sesamia calamistis, Sesamia cretica, Sesamia inferens, Diatraea grandiosella, Coniesta ignefusalis, Busseola fusca, Eldana saccharina, Ostrinia furnacalis, and Ostrinia nubilalis

Leaf feeders
lepidopteran caterpillars: Amsacta moorei, Mythimna loreyi, Mythimna separata, Cnaphalocrocis medinalis, Cnaphalocrocis patnalis, Spodoptera exigua, Spodoptera frugiperda, Spodoptera mauritia, Autoba silicula
grasshoppers: Diabolocatantops axillaris, Hieroglyphus banian, Hieroglyphus daganensis, Oedaleus senegalensis, and Schistocerca gregaria

Sucking pests
bugs: Blissus leucopterus, Nysius niger
hoppers: Cicadulina mbila, Cicadulina storeyi, and Pyrilla perpusilla
aphids: Rhopalosiphum maidis, Sitobion miscanthi, and Hyalopterus pruni

Other pests
beetle Chiloloba acuta
millet midge Geromyia penniseti
Euproctis spp., Orvasca subnotata, and Helicoverpa armigera
Spodoptera exempta, Spilarctia obliqua, Pachnoda interrupta, Phyllophaga spp., Thrips hawaiiensis, Myllocerus spp., and Peregrinus maidis
Holotrichia consanguinea and Holotrichia serrata
Tribolium castaneum

Africa
The larvae of several insect species, primarily belonging to the orders Coleoptera, Lepidoptera, Diptera, and Hemiptera, as well as Orthoptera adults, are persistent pearl millet pests in the Sahel. The following pest species are reported for northern Mali.

Coniesta ignefusalis (pearl millet stem-borer; Lepidoptera, Crambidae) attacks pearl millet, and also sorghum and maize, especially in the Sahel. It is the main pearl millet pest in Senegal.
Heliocheilus albipunctella (pearl millet head-miner; Lepidoptera, Noctuidae) attacks pearl millet. The larvae bore in a spiral path, destroying florets or grain.
Geromyia penniseti (millet grain midge): The larvae eat the developing grain and form white pupal cases attached to the tips of spikelets. Reported losses in Senegal are as high as 90 percent.
Pachnoda interrupta (millet beetle)
Psalydolytta fusca and Psalydolytta vestita (pearl millet blister beetle; Coleoptera, Meloidae) attack pearl millet. They are major millet pests in Mali.
Rhinyptia infuscata (Scarabaeidae, Rutelinae, Anomalini) is a nocturnal beetle, recorded as a locally important pest on millet flowers in Niger. Farmers in Niger often fight the species using fires set at night. It is also reported as sorghum pest in Senegal, and as a pest on maize, where the larvae attack the roots.
Sesamia calamistis (pink stem borer), especially in lowland forests. This species and the sugarcane borer (Eldana saccharina) are the primary pests of the pearl millet in Ivory Coast.
gall midges (Diptera, Cecidomyiidae): millet grain midge (Geromyia penniseti), sorghum midge (Contarinia sorghicola), and African rice gall midge (Orseolia oryzivora).
Dysdercus volkeri (cotton-stainer; Hemiptera, Pyrrhocoridae) attacks flowers.

Grasshoppers that frequently attack millets in the Dogon country of Mali are Oedaleus senegalensis, Kraussaria angulifera, Cataloipus cymbiferus, and Diabolocatantops axillaris.

In northern Ghana, Poophilus costalis (spittle bug) is reported as a millet pest, as well as Dysdercus volkeri, Heliocheilus albipunctella, Coniesta ignefusalis, and caterpillars of Amsacta moloneyi and Helicoverpa armigera.

In northern Nigeria, heavy infestations of Hycleus species, including Hycleus terminatus (syn. Mylabris afzelli), Hycleus fimbriatus (syn. Mylabris fimbriatus), Hycleus hermanniae (syn. Coryna hermanniae), and Hycleus chevrolati (syn. Coryna chevrolati), have affected early plantings of pearl millet crops.

Other regions
In South India, pests include the shoot fly Atherigona approximata.

In North America, regular pests include the chinch bug Blissus leucopterus.

See also
List of insect pests of millets
List of sorghum diseases

References

Common Names of Diseases, The American Phytopathological Society

Pearl millet